The Cook Islands requires its residents to register their motor vehicles and display vehicle registration plates. Current plates are Australian standard 372 mm × 134 mm, and use Australian and New Zealand stamping dies, as zeroes now have a slash through them (e.g. 52Ø9, 128Ø7).

References

Weblinks 
Cook Islands license plates pictures at Francoplaque

Cook Islands
Transport in the Cook Islands
Cook Islands-related lists